Leyney (Luíne) is a barony in central County Sligo, Ireland. It corresponds to the ancient túath of Luíghne.

References

Baronies of County Sligo